Drugs considered addictive or dangerous in the United Kingdom are called "controlled substances" and regulated by law. Until 1964 the medical treatment of dependent drug users was separated from the punishment of unregulated use and supply. Under this policy drug use remained low; there was relatively little recreational use and few dependent users, who were prescribed drugs by their doctors as part of their treatment. From 1964 drug use was decreasingly criminalised, with the framework still in place  largely determined by the Misuse of Drugs Act.

History
Until 1916 drug use was hardly controlled, and widely available opium and coca preparations commonplace.

Between 1916 and 1928 concerns about the use of these drugs by troops on leave from the First World War and then by people associated with the London criminal society gave rise to some controls being implemented. The distribution and use of morphine and cocaine, and later cannabis, were criminalised, but these drugs were available to addicts through doctors; this arrangement became known as the "British system" and was confirmed by the report of the Departmental Committee on Morphine and Heroin Addiction (Rolleston Committee) in 1926. The Rolleston Report was followed by "a period of nearly forty years of tranquillity in Britain, known as the Rolleston Era. During this period the medical profession regulated the distribution of licit opioid supplies and the provisions of the Dangerous Drugs Acts of 1920 and 1923 controlled illicit supplies." The medical treatment of dependent drug users was separated from the punishment of unregulated use and supply. This policy on drugs was maintained in Britain, and nowhere else, until the 1960s. Under this policy drug use remained low; there was relatively little recreational use and few dependent users, who were prescribed drugs by their doctors as part of their treatment.

The import of Marijuana via exportation is 1% of the trade within the drug industry in the UK.

It has been argued that the main legal innovations between 1925 and 1964 were in response to international pressures, not domestic problems.

In the 1960s a few doctors prescribed large amounts of heroin, some of which was diverted into the illegal market. Also substances such as cannabis, amphetamines and LSD started to become significant in the UK.

In 1961 the international Single Convention on Narcotic Drugs was introduced. To control global drug trading and use, it banned countries from treating addicts by prescribing illegal substances, allowing only scientific and medical uses of drugs. It was not itself binding on countries, which had to pass their own legislation.

Following pressure from the US, the UK implemented the Drugs (Prevention of Misuse) Act 1964 in 1964. Although the Convention dealt with the problems of drug production and trafficking, rather than the punishment of drug users, the 1964 Act introduced criminal penalties for possession by individuals of small amounts of drugs, as well as possession with intent to traffic or deal in drugs. The police were soon given the power to stop and search people for illegal drugs.

In 1971 the Misuse of Drugs Act (MDA) was passed, continuing measures in previous legislation, and classifying drugs into classes A (the most highly regulated), B, and C. Penalties for trafficking and supply were increased in the 1980s.

In 1991 a new phase of UK drug legislation started with an attempt to integrate health and criminal justice responses via Schedule 1A6 Probation Orders. This reduced the separation between medical and punitive responses that had characterised the British system in the past.

Legislation

See also
Beckley Foundation
Cannabis in the United Kingdom
Drug Equality Alliance
Drug policy
Drugs controlled by the UK Misuse of Drugs Act
List of British politicians who have acknowledged cannabis use
List of Statutory Instruments of the United Kingdom, list of links to instruments for each year
Release
Transform Drug Policy Foundation

References